Matlock Bath is a village and civil parish in Derbyshire, England. It lies in the Peak District, south of Matlock on the main A6 road, and approximately halfway between Buxton and Derby. The population of the civil parish at the 2011 census was 753. Originally built at the head of a dead-end dirt road running along the valley of the River Derwent from Matlock, the settlement developed in the 19th century as residential and a spa town which remains a tourist destination. The steep hillside restricts development with most buildings on one side of the valley and only footbridges across the river. The road was upgraded, becoming a through-way, now designated A6, avoiding the previous coaching road approach to Matlock from Cromford over very steep hills near to the Riber plateau area.

History
In 1698, warm springs were discovered and a bath house was built. As the waters became better known, access was improved by building the bridge into Old Matlock and in 1783, the opening of a new entrance at the south of the valley. Princess Victoria of Kent's royal visit in 1832 confirmed Matlock as a society venue of the time. Victoria's party visited a pair of museums and a petrifying well. John Ruskin and Lord Byron were visitors, Byron comparing it with alpine Switzerland, leading to a nickname of Little Switzerland.  Erasmus Darwin recommended the area to Josiah Wedgwood I for its beauty and soothing waters, and members of the families vacationed and settled there. Edward Levett Darwin, son of Francis Sacheverel Darwin, lived at Dale House in Matlock Bath, where he was a solicitor.

When the North Midland Railway opened in 1840, carriages plied for hire from Ambergate station. The Birmingham and Derby Junction Railway ran a number of excursions, taking the passengers onward from Ambergate by the Cromford Canal.

Matlock Bath is a designated conservation area with an Article 4 direction in relation to properties, predominantly along North and South Parade.

Government
Matlock Bath is in the local government district of Derbyshire Dales, and is part of the parliamentary constituency of the same name. The Member of Parliament is Sarah Dines of the Conservative Party.

Tourism

Matlock Bath has attractions including the Heights of Abraham park, Gulliver's Kingdom theme park, the Peak District Lead Mining Museum, the former Life in a Lens Museum of Photography & Old Times, the Grand Pavilion and an aquarium.

On the opposite bank of the river Derwent stands High Tor, a sheer cliff used by climbers and walkers. High Tor features Giddy Edge, a narrow winding path along the cliff edge. The Heights of Abraham cable cars link the base of High Tor rising to the Heights of Abraham.

In autumn of each year, the "Venetian Nights" are held with illuminations along the river and illuminated boats.

On Sundays in summer many hundreds of motorcyclists congregate in the town.

Popular culture references
Andrew Asibong's phantasmagorical novel Mameluke Bath is set in a futuristic version of Matlock Bath, and Eleanor Bowen-Jones' film Return to Mameluke Bath explores both real and fictional versions of the town.

Each year the Parish Council organises Pro Loco events in the area. There are pro loco art and photography competitions which are free to enter.

Transport

Railway
Matlock Bath railway station was built in 1849 on the Midland Railway line between London and Manchester. The section from Matlock to Buxton was closed in 1968, as result of the Beeching cuts.

Today, trains run generally hourly each way between Matlock and Derby on the Derwent Valley Line, operated by East Midlands Railway.

Roads
The A6, which links Carlisle with Luton, passes through the town; it provides access to Manchester, Stockport, Bakewell, Matlock and Derby.

Sport
The River Derwent in Matlock Bath is a location for canoeing, both recreational and competitive.  Matlock Canoe Club hosts national-level wild-water racing and slalom events here, and it is an assessment location for the BCU 4 Star award.

Gallery

See also
Listed buildings in Matlock Bath
St John the Baptist's Chapel, Matlock Bath
Grand Pavilion, Matlock Bath

References

External links

Video footage of Matlock Bath railway station
Matlock – the town and its history
 Extensive site on the history of Matlock and Matlock Bath

Villages in Derbyshire
Spa towns in England
Towns and villages of the Peak District
Civil parishes in Derbyshire
Derbyshire Dales